Orangeville is a village in eastern Trumbull County, Ohio, United States, along the state line with Pennsylvania. The population was 174 at the 2020 census. It is part of the Youngstown–Warren metropolitan area.

History
A post office called Orangeville has been in operation since 1840. The etymology of the name Orangeville is obscure; the name may be a transfer from Orange, Connecticut.

Geography
Orangeville is located at  (41.341047, -80.522833). It is one of the easternmost incorporated communities in Ohio.

Demographics

2010 census
As of the census of 2010, there were 197 people, 75 households, and 57 families living in the village. The racial makeup of the village was 95.4% White, 1.0% African American, 0.5% Asian, 2.0% from other races, and 1.0% from two or more races. Hispanic or Latino of any race were 1.0% of the population.

There were 75 households, of which 34.7% had children under the age of 18 living with them, 61.3% were married couples living together, 9.3% had a female householder with no husband present, 5.3% had a male householder with no wife present, and 24.0% were non-families. 22.7% of all households were made up of individuals, and 8% had someone living alone who was 65 years of age or older. The average household size was 2.63 and the average family size was 3.11.

The median age in the village was 38.4 years. 26.9% of residents were under the age of 18; 6.6% were between the ages of 18 and 24; 22.4% were from 25 to 44; 28.9% were from 45 to 64; and 15.2% were 65 years of age or older. The gender makeup of the village was 52.8% male and 47.2% female.

2000 census
As of the census of 2000, there were 189 people, 76 households, and 51 families living in the village. The population density was 238.4 people per square mile (92.4/km). There were 80 housing units at an average density of 100.9 per square mile (39.1/km). The racial makeup of the village was 96.83% White, 2.12% Native American, and 1.06% from two or more races.

There were 76 households, out of which 30.3% had children under the age of 18 living with them, 57.9% were married couples living together, 9.2% had a female householder with no husband present, and 31.6% were non-families. 28.9% of all households were made up of individuals, and 13.2% had someone living alone who was 65 years of age or older. The average household size was 2.49 and the average family size was 3.10.

In the village, the population was spread out, with 23.3% under the age of 18, 7.4% from 18 to 24, 30.2% from 25 to 44, 30.7% from 45 to 64, and 8.5% who were 65 years of age or older. The median age was 39 years. For every 100 females there were 98.9 males. For every 100 females age 18 and over, there were 95.9 males.

The median income for a household in the village was $44,375, and the median income for a family was $47,083. Males had a median income of $36,071 versus $25,625 for females. The per capita income for the village was $16,530. None of the population or families were below the poverty line.

References

Villages in Trumbull County, Ohio
Villages in Ohio
1840 establishments in Ohio
Populated places established in 1840